There have been two noteworthy nuclear accidents at the Tōkai village nuclear campus, Ibaraki Prefecture, Japan. The first accident occurred on 11 March 1997, producing an explosion after an experimental batch of solidified nuclear waste caught fire at the Power Reactor and Nuclear Fuel Development Corporation (PNC) radioactive waste bituminisation facility. Over twenty people were exposed to radiation. The second was a criticality accident at a separate fuel reprocessing facility belonging to Japan Nuclear Fuel Conversion Co. (JCO) on 30 September 1999 due to improper handling of liquid uranium fuel. The incident spanned approximately 20 hours and resulted in radiation exposure for 667 people and the death of two workers.

Nuclear power in Japan 
Nuclear power was an important energy alternative for natural-resource-poor Japan to limit dependence on imported energy, providing approximately 30% of Japan’s electricity up until the Fukushima nuclear disaster of 2011, after which nuclear electricity production fell into sharp decline.

The village of Tōkai's location (approximately seventy miles from Tokyo) and available land space made it ideal for nuclear power production, so a series of experimental nuclear reactors and then the Tōkai Nuclear Power Plantthe country's first commercial nuclear power stationwere built here. Over time, dozens of companies and government institutes were established nearby to provide nuclear research, experimentation, manufacturing, and fuel fabrication, enrichment and disposal facilities. Nearly one-third of Tokai’s population rely upon nuclear industry-related employment.

1997 nuclear waste accident 

On 11 March 1997, the village of Tokai's first serious nuclear-related incident occurred at PNC's bituminisation facility. It is sometimes referred to as the Dōnen accident (動燃事故, Dōnen jiko), 'Dōnen' being an abbreviation of PNC's full Japanese name Dōryokuro Kakunenryō Kaihatsu Jigyōdan. The site encased and solidified low-level liquid waste in molten asphalt (bitumen) for storage, and that day was trialling a new asphalt-waste mix, using 20% less asphalt than normal. A gradual chemical reaction inside one fresh barrel ignited the already-hot contents at 10:00 a.m. and quickly spread to several others nearby. Workers failed to properly extinguish the fire, and smoke and radiation alarms forced all personnel to evacuate the building. At 8 p.m., just as people were preparing to reenter the building, built up flammable gases ignited and exploded, breaking windows and doors, which allowed smoke and radiation to escape into the surrounding area.

The incident exposed 37 nearby personnel to trace amounts of radiation in what the government's Science and Technology Agency declared the country’s worst-yet nuclear accident, which was rated a 3 on the International Nuclear Event Scale. A week after the event, meteorological officials detected unusually high levels of caesium 40 kilometers (25 miles) south-west of the plant. Aerial views over the nuclear processing plant building showed a damaged roof from the fire and explosion allowing continued external radiation exposure.

PNC management mandated two workers to falsely report the chronological events leading to the facility evacuation in order to cover-up lack of proper supervision. Dōnen leadership failed to immediately report the fire to the Science and Technology Agency (STA). This delay was due to their own internal investigation of the fire causing hampered immediate emergency response teams and prolonged radioactivity exposure. Dōnen facility officials initially reported a 20 percent increase of radiation levels in the area surrounding the reprocessing plant but later revealed the true percent was ten times higher than initially published. Tokai residents demanded criminal prosecution of PNC officials, reorganization of company leadership and closure of the plant itself. Following public outcry, the facility closed until reopening in November 2000 when it was reinstated as a nuclear fuel reprocessing plant.

Later, Prime Minister Ryutaro Hashimoto criticized the delay that allowed radiation to continue to impact local areas.

1999 accident 
The second, more serious Tokai nuclear accident (Japanese: 東海村JCO臨界事故 Tōkai-mura JCO-rinkai-jiko) occurred approximately four miles away from the PNC facility on 30 September 1999, at a fuel enrichment plant operated by JCO, a subsidiary of Sumitomo Metal Mining Company. It was the worst civilian nuclear radiation accident in Japan prior to the Fukushima Daiichi nuclear disaster of 2011. The incident exposed the surrounding population to hazardous nuclear radiation after the uranium mixture reached criticality. Two of the three technicians mixing fuel lost their lives. The incident was caused by lack of regulatory supervision, inadequate safety culture and improper technician training and education.

The JCO facility converted uranium hexafluoride into enriched uranium dioxide fuel. This served as the first step in producing nuclear reactor fuel rods for Japan's power plants and research reactors. Enriching nuclear fuel requires precision and has the potential to impose extreme risks to technicians. If done improperly, the process of combining nuclear products can produce a fission reaction which, in turn, produces radiation. In order to enrich the uranium fuel, a specific chemical purification procedure is required. The steps included feeding small batches of uranium oxide powder into a designated dissolving tank in order to produce uranyl nitrate using nitric acid. Next, the mixture is carefully transported to a specially-crafted buffer tank. The buffer tank containing the combined ingredients is specially designed to prevent fission activity from reaching criticality. In a precipitation tank, ammonia is added forming a solid product. This tank is meant to capture any remaining nuclear waste contaminants. In the final process, uranium oxide is placed in the dissolving tanks until purified, without enriching the isotopes, in a wet-process technology specialized by Japan.

Pressure placed upon JCO to increase efficiency led the company to employ an illegal procedure wherein they skipped several key steps in the enrichment procedure. The technicians poured the product by hand in stainless-steel buckets directly into a precipitation tank. This process inadvertently contributed to a critical mass level incident triggering uncontrolled nuclear chain reactions over the next several hours.

Nuclear criticality event chronology 
JCO facility technicians Hisashi Ouchi, Masato Shinohara, and Yutaka Yokokawa were speeding up the last few steps of the fuel/conversion process to meet shipping requirements. It was JCO's first batch of fuel for the Jōyō experimental fast breeder reactor in three years; no proper qualification and training requirements were established to prepare for the process. To save processing time, and for convenience, the team mixed the chemicals in stainless-steel buckets. The workers followed JCO operating manual guidance in this process but were unaware it was not approved by the STA. Under correct operating procedure, uranyl nitrate would be stored inside a buffer tank and gradually pumped into the precipitation tank in  increments.

The hazardous level was reached after the technicians added a seventh bucket containing aqueous uranyl nitrate, enriched to 18.8% 235U, to the tank. The solution added to the tank was almost seven times the legal mass limit specified by the STA.

The nuclear fuel conversion standards specified in the 1996 JCO Operating Manual dictated the proper procedures regarding dissolution of uranium oxide powder in a designated dissolution tank. The buffer tank's tall, narrow geometry was designed to hold the solution safely and to prevent criticality. In contrast, the precipitation tank had not been designed to hold unlimited quantities of this type of solution. The designed wide cylindrical shape made it favorable to criticality. The workers bypassed the buffer tanks entirely, opting to pour the uranyl nitrate directly into the precipitation tank. An uncontrolled nuclear fission began immediately. The resulting nuclear fission chain became self-sustaining, emitting intense gamma and neutron radiation. At the time of the event, Ouchi had his body draped over the tank while Shinohara stood on a platform to assist in pouring the solution. Yokokawa was sitting at a desk four meters away. All three technicians observed a blue flash (possibly Cherenkov radiation) and gamma radiation alarms sounded. Over the next several hours the fission reaction produced continuous chain reactions.

Ouchi and Shinohara immediately experienced pain, nausea, and difficulty breathing; both workers went to the decontamination room where Ouchi vomited. Ouchi received the largest radiation exposure, resulting in rapid difficulties with mobility, coherence, and loss of consciousness. Upon the point of critical mass, large amounts of high-level gamma radiation set off alarms in the building, prompting the three technicians to evacuate. All three of the workers were unaware of the impact of the accident or reporting criteria. A worker in the next building became aware of the injured employees and contacted emergency medical assistance; an ambulance escorted them to the nearest hospital. The fission products contaminated the fuel reprocessing building and immediately outside the nuclear facility. Emergency service workers arrived and escorted other plant workers outside of the facility's muster zones.

The next morning, workers ended the nuclear chain reaction by draining water from the surrounding cooling jacket installed on the precipitation tank. The water served as a neutron reflector. A boric acid solution was added to the precipitation tank to reduce all contents to sub-critical levels; boron was selected for its neutron absorption properties.

Tokaimura evacuation 
By mid-afternoon the plant workers and surrounding residents were asked to evacuate. Five hours after the start of the criticality, evacuation commenced of some 161 people from 39 households within a 350-meter radius from the conversion building. Twelve hours after the incident, 300,000 surrounding residents of the nuclear facility were told to stay indoors and cease all agricultural production. This restriction was lifted the following afternoon. Almost 15 days later, the facility instituted protection methods with sandbags and other shielding to protect from residual gamma radiation.

Aftermath
Without an emergency plan or public communication from the JCO, confusion and panic followed the event. Authorities warned locals not to harvest crops or drink well water. In order to ease public concerns, officials began radiation testing of residents living approximately 6 miles from the facility. Over the next 10 days, approximately 10,000 medical check-ups were conducted. Dozens of emergency workers and residents who lived nearby were hospitalized and hundreds of thousands of others were forced to remain indoors for 24 hours. Testing confirmed 39 of the workers were exposed to the radiation. At least 667 workers, first-responders, and nearby residents were exposed to excess radiation as a result of the accident. Radioactive gas levels stayed high in the area even after the plant was sealed. Finally on October 12th it was discovered that a roof ventilation fan had been left on and it was shut-down.  Sometime after the incident, people in the area were asked to lend any gold they had to allow calculations of the size and range of the gamma ray burst. 

Ultimately the incident was classified as an “irradiation” not “contamination” accident under Level 4 on the Nuclear Event Scale. This determination labeled the situation low risk outside of the facility. The technicians and workers in the facility were measured for radiation contamination. The three technicians measured significantly higher levels of radiation than the measurement designated the maximum allowable dose (50 mSv) for Japanese nuclear workers. Many employees of the Company and local population suffered accidental radiation exposure exceeding safe levels. Over fifty plant workers tested up to 23 mSv and local residents up to 15 mSv. Fatal doses of radiation ended the lives of two technicians, Ouchi and Shinohara.

Impact on technicians 
According to the radiation testing by the STA, Ouchi was exposed to 17 Sv of radiation, Shinohara 10 Sv, and Yokokawa received 3 Sv. The two technicians who received the higher doses, Ouchi and Shinohara, died several months later.  

Hisashi Ouchi, 35, was transported and treated at the University of Tokyo Hospital for 83 days. Ouchi suffered serious radiation burns to most of his body, experienced severe damage to his internal organs, and had a near-zero white blood cell count. Without a functioning immune system, Ouchi was vulnerable to hospital-borne pathogens and was placed in a special radiation ward to limit the risk of contracting an infection. Doctors attempted to restore some functionality to Ouchi's immune system by administering peripheral blood stem cell transplantation, which at the time was a new form of treatment. After receiving the transplant from his sister, Ouchi initially experienced increased white blood cell counts temporarily but succumbed to his other injuries shortly thereafter. The leukocytes being produced by the transplanted tissue were found to have been mutated by the residual radiation present in his body, triggering autoimmune responses that exacerbated his rapidly deteriorating condition, and white blood cell counts began to decrease. Numerous other interventions were conducted in an attempt to arrest further decline of Ouchi's severely damaged body, including repeated use of cultured skin grafts and pharmacological interventions with painkillers, broad-spectrum antibiotics and granulocyte colony-stimulating factor, without any measurable success.

At the wishes of his family, doctors repeatedly revived Ouchi when his heart stopped, even as it became clear the damage his body had sustained through radiation was untreatable. The family deliberated that if Ouchi's heart stopped again, they would not force the situation again. His wife hoped that he would at least survive to the January 1st since it was the arrival of the 2000s. Despite their efforts, his condition deteriorated into multiple organ failure resulting from extensive radiation damage, exacerbated by the repeated incidents where Ouchi's heart stopped. He died on 21 December 1999 following an unrecoverable cardiac arrest. According to Japanese law, the doctors were legally obligated to proceed with treatment until nothing more could be done, with the exception of express permission from Ouchi to suspend treatment, permission that was not granted during the period in which he was still able to communicate.

Masato Shinohara, 40, was transported to the same facility where he died on 27 April 2000 of multiple organ failure. He endured radical cancer treatment, numerous successful skin grafts, and a transfusion from congealed umbilical cord blood (to boost stem cell count). Despite his seven month battle, he was unable to fight radiation induced infections and internal bleeding, resulting in fatal lung and kidney failure.

Their supervisor, Yutaka Yokokawa, 54, received treatment from the National Institute of Radiological Sciences (NIRS) in China. He was released three months later with minor radiation sickness. He faced negligence charges in October 2000.

Contributors to both accidents 

According to the International Atomic Energy Agency, the cause of the accidents were "human error and serious breaches of safety principles". Several human errors caused the incident, including careless material handling procedures, inexperienced technicians, inadequate supervision and obsolete safety procedures on the operating floor. The company had not had any incidents for over 15 years making company employees complacent in their daily responsibilities.

The 1999 incident resulted from poor management of operation manuals, failure to qualify technicians and engineers, and improper procedures associated with handling nuclear chemicals. The lack of communication between the engineers and workers contributed to lack of reporting when the incident arose. Had the company corrected the errors after the 1997 incident, the 1999 incident would have been considerably less devastating or may not have happened.

Comments within the 2012 Report by the National Diet of Japan Fukushima Nuclear Accident Independent Investigation Commission notice regulatory and nuclear industry overconfidence, and governance failures may equally apply to the Tokaimura nuclear accident.

Victim compensation and plant closure 
Over 600 plant workers, firefighters, emergency personnel and local residents were exposed to radioactivity following the incident. In October 1999, JCO set up advisory booths to process compensation claims and inquiries of those affected. By July 2000, over 7,000 compensation claims were filed and settled. In September 2000 JCO agreed to pay $121 million in compensation to settle 6,875 claims from people exposed to radiation and affected agricultural and service businesses. All residents within 350 meters of the incident and those forced to evacuate received compensation if they agreed to not sue the company in the future.

In late March 2000, the STA cancelled JCO’s credentials for operation serving as the first Japanese plant operator to be punished by law for mishandling nuclear radiation. This suit was followed by the company president’s resignation. In October, six officials from JCO were charged with professional negligence derived from failure to properly train technicians and knowingly subverting safety procedures.

Resulting legal suits 
In April 2001 six employees, including the chief of production department at the time, pleaded guilty to a charge of negligence resulting in death. Among those arrested was Yokokawa for his failure to supervise proper procedures. The JCO President also pleaded guilty on behalf of the company. During the trial, the jury learned that a 1995 JCO safety committee had approved the use of steel buckets in the procedure. Furthermore, a widely distributed but unauthorized 1996 manual recommended the use of buckets in making the solution. A STA report indicated JCO management had permitted these hazardous practices beginning in 1993 to shortcut the conversion process, even though it was contrary to approved nuclear chemical handling procedures.

As a response to the incidents, special laws were put in place stipulating operational safety procedures and quarterly inspection requirements. These inspections focused on the proper conduct of workers and leadership. This change mandated both safety education and quality assurance of all facilities and activities associated with nuclear power generation. Starting in 2000, Japan's atomic and nuclear commissions began regular investigations of facilities, expansive education regarding proper procedures and safety culture regarding handling nuclear chemicals and waste.

Efforts to comply with emergency preparedness procedures and international guideline requirements continued. New systems were put in place for handling a similar incident with governing legislature and institutions in an effort to prevent further situations from occurring.

Japan relies heavily on imports for 80% of all energy requirements, due to this shortage, mounting pressures to produce self-sustaining energy sources remain. In 2014, the Japanese government decided to establish the "Strategic Energy Plan" naming nuclear power as an important power source that can safely stabilize and produce the energy supply and demand of the country. This event contributed to antinuclear activist movements against production of nuclear energy in Japan. To this day, the tensions between the need for produced power outside of nonexistent natural resources and the safety of the country’s population remain. Advocacy for acute nuclear disease victims and eradication of nuclear related incidents has led to several movements across the globe promoting human welfare and environmental conservation.

See also
Nuclear power in Japan
Fukushima Daiichi nuclear disaster
Rokkasho Reprocessing Plant, meant to be the successor to the Tokai reprocessing Plant

References

External links
 What Happened at Tokaimura?
 Tokaimura Criticality Accident – What happened in Japan
 International Atomic Energy Agency: “Report on the preliminary fact finding mission following the accident at the nuclear fuel processing facility in Tokaimura, Japan”, 1999 (9.5 MB PDF, here )
 Criticality accident at Tokai nuclear fuel plant (Japan) Wise Uranium project

Nuclear accidents and incidents
Nuclear reprocessing sites
Nuclear history of Japan
Man-made disasters in Japan
Heisei period
1997 in Japan
1997 industrial disasters
1999 in Japan
1999 industrial disasters
Tōkai, Ibaraki
1997 disasters in Japan
1999 disasters in Japan